Emilce Cuda (born 26 December 1965) is an Argentine theologian, university professor, and Roman Curia official.

Dubbed "the woman who knows how to read Pope Francis", she is known for interpreting the teachings of Pope Francis through the Argentine Theology of the People,  political philosophers, and her own native exposure to Pope Francis’ cultural milieu.

She is the first Argentine laywoman to receive a pontifical PhD in moral theology  and the first woman to hold an executive position in the Pontifical Commission for Latin America.

Education 
She obtained her BA (1990), MA (2005) and PhD/STD (2010) from the Pontificia Universidad Católica Argentina. She studied philosophy at Universidad de Buenos Aires, UBA. She received an MBA (2001) from the Universidad de Ciencias Empresariales y Sociales.

On December 14, 2022, the National University of Rosario conferred on her the degree of Doctor of Humane Letters, in honoris causa.    Pope Francis thanked the university for the recognition as "a deserved distinction for the academic, intellectual and personal merits of Emilce (Cuda), a tireless fighter for social justice, peace, decent work and the beauty of creation, especially in Latin America".

Work 

She is a research professor at Universidad Nacional Arturo Juaretche (UNAJ) and a visiting professor at the UCA, the UBA, the University of St. Thomas (Texas) and Loyola University Chicago. She was a visiting research professor in residence at Boston College (2016) and DePaul University (2019). She is an advisor and professor for the Episcopal Conference of Latin America (CELAM), through its social school CEBITIPAL.  She collaborates with the Dicastery for Promoting Integral Human Development of the Roman curia of the Holy See, with the International Catholic Migration Commission (ICMC) of Geneva in the program "The Future of Work. Labor after Laudato Si and Post Covid 19", with The Economy of Francesco, with the Episcopal Conference of Argentina, and with the Pastoral Juvenil de la Arquidiócesis de Los Angeles. She is a visible figure in the academic, ecclesial and social organizations of Argentina and Latin America.   She is a member of the global network  Catholic Theological Ethics in the World Church(CTEWC). where she was coordinator for Latin America and the Caribbean between 2016 and 2018.

She appears frequently at conferences and on-line panel discussions, speaking chiefly on labor issues and the economy of Francis Her approach seems to be based on pontifical social encyclicals, Catholic cultural and intellectual history, Latin American popular culture and politics, and uniquely Argentine elements such as tango lyrics.

Her formulation ‘pueblo-pobre-trabajador’ does not render directly into English, in which people and poor are not the connotative singular nouns that they are in Spanish.  Resonating with Pope Francis's phrase "God’s holy faithful people" and the preferential option for the poor of Catholic social teaching, Cuda's phrase suggests that the poor, destitute as they may be, are the workers who make up the people where grace operates.

Curial service
On 26 July 2021, Pope Francis named Cuda to head the office of the Pontifical Commission for Latin America. She took up her responsibilities at the Vatican on 1 September.  On 18 February 2022 Pope Francis promoted her to secretary of the Commission, on an equal footing with its other secretary Rodrigo Guerra López.

On 13 April 2022 Pope Francis appointed her to the Pontifical Academy of Social Sciences.  On 19 May 2022 Pope Francis appointed her to the Pontifical Academy for Life.

Personal life
She is married to an American and has two children. She spends part of the year at a family home in Arizona.

Para Leer a Francisco - Reading Francis 

Reading Francis – Theology, Ethics and Politics (Spanish: Para Leer a Francisco – Teologia, Etica y Politica) was published in 2014.  Prefaced by Scannone, it examines the theological and philosophical underpinnings of Pope Francis’ writings.  Spanish newspaper ABC wrote,  "It allows us to delve into the main lines of Theology of the People, covering the pastoral and ethical implications of the decisions approved by the Latin American episcopate held in Aparecida."

Selected works 
 Democracia y Catolicismo en Estados Unidos: 1792–1945.  Democracy and Catholicism in the United States.  PhD thesis. 2010. In Spanish. 
 Democracia en el Magisterio Pontificio. Democracy in the Pontifical Magisterium. Masters thesis. 2014. In Spanish. 
 Para leer a Francisco. Teología, ética y política.  Reading Francis. 2016. In Spanish.  Translated into Italian in 2018.
 Nuevos Estilos Sindicales en América Latina y el Caribe. (Editor). New Styles of Labor Unions in Latin America. . 2016. In Spanish.
 Hacia una ética de la participación y la esperanza.  (Editor) Toward an Ethic of Participation and Hope. Prologue by James Keenan SJ.. 2017 In Spanish.

References 

1965 births
Living people
Argentine theologians
Argentine Roman Catholic theologians
Argentine Roman Catholics
21st-century Argentine women writers
21st-century Argentine writers
Writers from Buenos Aires
Argentine non-fiction writers
Women Christian theologians
Women officials of the Roman Curia